Give 'em Hell, Harry! is a biographical play and 1975 film, written by playwright Samuel Gallu. Both the play and film are a one-man show about former President of the United States Harry S. Truman. Give 'em Hell, Harry! stars James Whitmore, and was directed by Steve Binder and Peter H. Hunt.

Title origin
The title comes from an incident that took place during the 1948 presidential election campaign. In Bremerton, Washington, Truman delivered a speech attacking the Republicans. During the speech, a supporter yelled out, "Give 'em Hell, Harry!" Truman replied, "I don't give them Hell. I just tell the truth about them, and they think it's Hell." Subsequently, "Give 'em Hell, Harry!" became a lifetime slogan for Truman supporters.

History
The play previewed in Hershey, Pennsylvania, followed by its official opening at Ford's Theatre in Washington, D. C. Its April 17, 1975, premiere was hosted by Truman's daughter Margaret, and attended by President Gerald Ford. The play then went on to a six-city tour, during which it was videotaped for film on the stage of the Moore Theatre in Seattle, using a live editing process called Theatrovision. It was also recorded and released by United Artists Records.

Although the play has been regularly revived, it did not make its New York debut until July 2008 at St. Luke's Theatre.

Accolades

Give 'em Hell, Harry! is only the third film to have its entire credited cast (Whitmore) nominated for an Oscar, the first two being Who's Afraid of Virginia Woolf? in 1966, for which almost all members excluding the extras were nominated, and Sleuth in 1972.

References

External links
 
 Department Of The Interior National Register of Historic Places and B.P.O.E. #1181 / City of Bremerton plaques commemorating location of Truman's "Give Em Hell Harry" speech.

1975 films
Cultural depictions of Harry S. Truman
Filmed stage productions
Films about presidents of the United States
Films directed by Peter H. Hunt
Films directed by Steve Binder
Grammy Award for Best Spoken Word Album
Monodrama
One-character films
Plays based on real people
Plays for one performer
1970s English-language films